Events in 2000 in Japanese television.

Debuts

Ongoing shows 
 Music Fair, music (1964–present)
 Mito Kōmon, jidaigeki (1969-2011)
 Monster Farm, anime (1999-2001)
 Sazae-san, anime (1969–present)
 FNS Music Festival, music (1974-present)
 Panel Quiz Attack 25, game show (1975–present)
 Doraemon, anime (1979-2005)
 Soreike! Anpanman, anime (1988-present)
 Downtown no Gaki no Tsukai ya Arahende!!, game show (1989–present)
 Crayon Shin-chan, anime (1992-present)
 Shima Shima Tora no Shimajirō, anime (1993-2008)
 Nintama Rantarō, anime (1993–present)
 Chibi Maruko-chan, anime (1995-present)
 Kochira Katsushika-ku Kameari Kōen-mae Hashutsujo, anime (1996-2004)
 Detective Conan, anime (1996–present)
 SASUKE, sports (1997-present)
 Ojarumaru, anime (1998-present)
 Pocket Monsters, anime (1998-2002)
 Kyorochan, anime (1999-2001)
 Hunter × Hunter, anime (1999-2001)
 One Piece, anime (1999–present)

Endings

TV Specials

See also 
 2000 in anime
 List of Japanese television dramas
 2000 in Japan
 List of Japanese films of 2000

References